Bank Australia is an Australian customer-owned bank based in Collingwood, Victoria. The organisation can trace its origins back to 1957, when the CSIRO Co-operative Credit Society was formed. Over succeeding years, mergers among 72 other credit unions and co-operative banks eventually led to the creation of the Members & Education Credit Union (mecu) in 2003, which became Bankmecu in 2011, and Bank Australia in 2015.

Bank Australia is a member organisation of the Australian Banking Association, the Global Alliance for Banking on Values, and is a certified B Corporation.

History 
Bank Australia is an amalgamation of 72 credit unions and co-operatives. Starting in 1957 as the CSIRO Co-operative Credit Society, the bank expanded to become Australia’s first customer-owned bank in 2011, trading under the name Bankmecu. In 2015, the bank rebranded itself as Bank Australia.

Sustainability 
In June 2020, Bank Australia became a certified B Corp.

Bank Australia has been carbon neutral since 2011 and in 2018 became certified carbon neutral by the Australian Government’s National Carbon Offset Standard. In 2019 they switched to 100% renewable energy. It was the first bank in Australia to do so. In 2022, Bank Australia responded to shareholder demands and set a net zero target for 2035.

The Bank Australia Conservation Reserve is a 927 hectare private land reserve owned by the bank and its customers. The reserve is located in Victoria's Wimmera region and is made up of three properties and is protected from development forever through a conservation covenant. The company purchased the first of the three properties in 2008 in response to customer concerns about the environment. Greening Australia and Trust for Nature manage the Reserve. In 2018, Bank Australia, in partnership with Greening Australia and Trust for Nature, won the Banksia Large Business Award for the conservation reserve's ten-year strategy.

Bank Australia has reaffirmed that they have never invested and will never invest money in fossil fuels, live animal exports, military weaponry, tobacco, or gambling.

Net Zero 
In April 2022, Bank Australia announced their Climate Action Strategy, and set a target to achieve Net zero emissions by 2035. This included plans for reductions of their scope 3 emissions. Bank Australia will also be working with customers to help them reduce their emissions from electricity and gas use.

Car loan Financing 
In August 2022, Bank Australia's chief impact officer, Sasha Courville, announced that Bank Australia will cease funding car loans for new fossil fuel (internal combustion engine) vehicles from 2025 as part of its commitment to achieve net zero carbon emissions by 2035. “a signal to the Australian market about the rapid acceleration in the transition from internal combustion to electric vehicles we expect to see in the next few years.” - Sasha Courville, Bank Australia's Chief Impact Officer.

Impact fund
Bank Australia allocates 4% of its after tax profits to the Bank Australia Impact Fund. The fund supports projects and partnerships that "benefit people, communities and the planet". As part of the fund, the bank runs an annual customer grants program, many concerned with investment in sustainability and community renewable energy projects.

Locations 
The company's head office is in Collingwood, Victoria, and its National Contact Centre is located in Moe in the Latrobe Valley in Victoria.

Products and services 
Bank Australia offers banking products including everyday banking, savings, term deposits, personal and car loans, home loans, credit cards and commercial banking services.

It operates digital banking services through internet and mobile app banking. Customers also have access to Apple Pay, Google Pay and Android Pay, Round UP, and fee free withdrawals at Bank Australia ATMs and all of the major banks’ ATMs.

As an authorised deposit-taking institution, Bank Australia is covered under the Financial Claims Scheme. Like all other authorised institutions, balances of up to 250,000 are guaranteed by the Australian Government should Bank Australia collapse.

Domain name dispute 
Bank Australia launched a domain name dispute on 21 January 2016 for the domain names bankaus.com.au and bankaustralia.com.au. In a single-member judgement on behalf of the WIPO Arbitration and Mediation Center, the claim was denied. Since the domain names in question were registered in 2011 and 2008 respectively, and the name "Bank Australia" was registered only in 2014, there was no evidence that the owner of the domain names had registered them to "prevent the owner of a name, trademark or service mark from reflecting the mark in a corresponding domain name" (cybersquatting) or "primarily for the purpose of disrupting the business or activities of another person".

References 

Australian companies established in 1957
Credit unions of Australia
2003 establishments in Australia
Banks established in 2003
B Lab-certified corporations in Australia
Companies based in Melbourne
Ethical banking